Belden Village Mall is a shopping mall in Jackson Township, Stark County, Ohio, United States, a suburb of Canton. Its current anchor tenants are Dave & Buster's (in the upper level of the former Sears), Dillard's (formerly Higbee's), and Macy's (formerly O'Neil's, later May Company Ohio, then Kaufmann's).

History
Belden Village Mall opened October 1, 1970 as a fully enclosed shopping center. Encompassing , it was anchored by O'Neil's, Sears, Higbee's and Halle's. Higbee's operated until 1992 when it was rebranded by Dillard's. O'Neil's was merged into May Company Ohio in 1989, which in turn became Kaufmann's in 1993.

Belden Village underwent a minor facelift in 1989.  The food court was adorned in pastel colored flags hanging from the ceiling, along with updates to tenant signage.  Major entrances were refreshed with glass atriums. The Kaufmann's store was renamed Macy's on September 9, 2006.

Outlot businesses have been added at different times to the mall.  These include a Sears Auto Center (Closed 2020), Chili's Bar & Grille which opened in 1986, Bravo Cucina, a restaurant opening in 2006, and Max & Erma's, which is now closed opened in 2005. After many years of ownership by Cleveland developers The Jacobs Group, the Westfield Group acquired the shopping center in early 2002, and renamed it "Westfield Shoppingtown Belden Village", dropping the "Shoppingtown" name in June 2005. In November 2013 Starwood Retail Partners, now Starwood Capital Group purchased several Westfield properties including Belden Village. The mall name returned to "Belden Village Mall". In the latter half of 2016, the main entrance was redone in a more modern style. Also in 2016, the Max and Erma's was closed and later converted into a Burntwood Tavern. In 2017, a former truck bay was transformed in new storefronts and a Melt Bar & Grilled. In 2019, the food court received a one-day renovation, including new furniture and lighting. 

In 2015, Sears Holdings spun off 235 of its properties, including the Sears at Belden Village Mall, into Seritage Growth Properties. Dave & Buster's opened on November 4, 2019. On October 23, 2019 it was announced that Sears would close its Belden Village location after a decision was not to renew their lease, Their last day of operation was January 12, 2020.

The top bidder on the package was a joint venture of Golden East Investors and Pacific Retail Capital Partners. The venture, as agreed to by Starwood's senior trustees, is designed to resolve debts and stabilize assets, ending in a potential sale.

See also
 Retail Partners https://web.archive.org/web/20151127143937/http://www.starwoodretail.com/malls

References

External links
Official Belden Village Mall Website

Shopping malls in Ohio
Buildings and structures in Stark County, Ohio
Tourist attractions in Stark County, Ohio
Shopping malls established in 1970